{{Infobox television channel
| name           = ATN Channel
| logo           = ATN Channel 2017.png
| logo_caption   = ''ATN Channel logo| logo_size      =
| launch_date    = 
| closed_date    = 
| picture_format = 1080i (HDTV)(2013-present)480i (SDTV)(1998-present)
| network        = 
| owner          = Asian Television Network
| country        = Canada
| area           = National
| headquarters   = Markham, Ontario
| former_names   = SATV (South Asian Television) (1998-2001)ATN Zee TV (2001-2013)ATN Star Plus (2013-2017)
| website        =  
}}ATN Channel is a Canadian Category A specialty channel, owned by Asian Television Network (ATN). It is the flagship channel of the Asian Television Network and features programming from &TV as well as Canadian content in several South Asian languages.

History
On September 4, 1996, South Asian Television Canada Limited was granted approval from the CRTC to launch an ethnic specialty television channel called SATV, a regional service catering to the South Asian community in Ontario.

On August 7, 1997, South Asian Television Canada Limited received approval to convert SATV into a national service, available across Canada.

The channel officially launched in May 1998 as ATN via cable and satellite.

ATN signed an agreement with Zee Network, securing the exclusive rights to programming from Zee TV, India's top rated channel at the time.  This milestone agreement marked the first major content acquisition for ATN and resulted in Zee TV becoming the main source of programming for ATN channel which was subsequently renamed ATN Zee TV.

On September 7, 2006, ATN signed an agreement with STAR Plus, India's top rated entertainment channel.  Programming from STAR Plus was subsequently added to the lineup of ATN Zee TV in October 2006 and resulted in the channel being renamed ATN channel.

On January 23, 2013, it was announced that ATN would no longer be airing any programming from Zee TV as of February 1, 2013,  due to the expiration of its licensing agreement with Zee.  It was also announced that ATN plans on launching an HD feed of ATN channel in March 2013.

On January 29, 2013, it was announced that Zee TV Canada will be launched as a 24/7 channel in Canada, which will be available on Bell, Telus, Rogers. http://www.indiantelevision.com/headlines/y2k13/jan/jan253.php

On October 6, 2017, ATN Star Plus lost the rights to programming from Star Plus.  It subsequently  began airing foreign programming from &TV.

ATN HD
On June 1, 2013, ATN launched ATN HD''', a high definition simulcast of the standard definition feed.  It is currently available on Bell Fibe TV, Optik TV and Rogers Cable.

See also
 List of South Asian television channels in Canada

References

External links
 
 &TV

Analog cable television networks in Canada
Television channels and stations established in 1998
ATN